The 7th Armoured Division was an armoured division of the British Army and formed in 1938. The division was commanded by a general officer commanding (GOC), who received orders from a level above him in the chain of command, and then used the forces within the division to undertake the mission assigned. In addition to directing the tactical battle in which the division was involved, the GOC oversaw a staff and the administrative, logistical, medical, training, and discipline concerns of the division. From its founding to when it was redesignated in the 1950s, the division had 18 permanent GOCs; one of whom was killed and another wounded.

The division was formed in Egypt, from mechanised-cavalry and tank units that were based there, following raising tensions with Italy. In 1939, the Mobile Division was renamed the Armoured Division and then became the 7th Armoured Division a year later. Following the Italian entry into the war, in June 1940, the division skirmished with their opposing forces throughout several engagements. After the Italian invasion of Egypt, a British counterstroke (Operation Compass) was launched in December 1940 and the division was able to help in the destruction of the Italian Tenth Army. Over the following two years, it fought in all the major battles of the back and forth Western Desert campaign. The fighting in the Western Desert saw the death of one commanding officer, Jock Campbell. Following the Second Battle of El Alamein it assisted in the pursuit west and joined in the Tunisian campaign and that fighting resulted in John Harding being wounded. While not selected for the subsequent Allied invasion of Sicily, it did land in mainland Italy for the opening stages of the Italian campaign. Chosen as a veteran formation to bolster the Second Army for Operation Overlord, the division landed in France in June 1940. It fought in the Battle of Caen, notably the Battle of Villers-Bocage and Operation Goodwood. It then pushed east across France, into the Low Countries, supported Operation Market Garden, and took part in the Western Allied invasion of Germany. 

Located in Germany at the end of the war, it became part of the British Army of the Rhine and was disbanded in 1958. Its nickname, the Desert Rats, and a variant of its insignia were transferred to the 7th Armoured Brigade who then maintain the division's legacy until they were disbanded in the 2010s.

General officer commanding

Notes

References

 
 
 
 
 

British Army personnel by war
British Army personnel of World War II
British Army general officer commanding lists